Kolormondo is a company which makes objects presenting colours and their interrelations in three dimensions. The Kolormondo system is used to understand, identify and communicate colours. Kolormondo is a patent pending Swedish innovation. The founder of Kolormondo, Nicoline Kinch, has received the Inventors Prize of the city of Stockholm.

Colours in 3D 
Kolormondo is displayed as a 3D Colour Puzzle and as a digital 3D Colour Globe. The Kolormondo 3D Colour Puzzle is based on CMYK, Cyan (C), Magenta (M), Yellow (Y) and on Black (K). These are pigment based colours, which are used on printed media. Kolormondo's digital colour globe is built with RGB, Red (R), Green (G) and Blue (B). These are light colours and are used on the screen.

The Kolormondo system is three-dimensional displayed as a globe. At the Equator, you find the most pure hues, those that constitute the colour circle. The North Pole is white while the South Pole is black. The closer you get to the white North Pole the lighter the colours become. If you go south towards the black South Pole the colours get darker. Towards the globe's core, colours gradually turn grey. A pillar or a column between the North and the South Pole is the grey scale.

Kolormondo invites you to systematically navigate between colours and explore how they blend into each other. The gradual change from any given colour in/out to its less/more saturated “relative” colour is clear as well as the change in value going up for a lighter version or down for a more black. You can see how apricot turns into orange, transforms into brown when following colours along the sphere's longitude; while the same brown turned into purple in one direction along the latitude, and into dark green going the other way.

See also 
Color model
Color
RGB
CMYK
Color solid
Color chart

References

External links 
Kolormondo

Color